Ondrea "Vickie" Victoria Gates (previously Ondrea Victoria Gates-Lewis born September 25, 1962) is a professional female bodybuilder from the United States.

Early life and education
Ondrea Victoria Gates was born on September 9, 1962 in San Antonio, Texas, and raised in Lawton, Oklahoma, one of six children (four sisters, one brother). She was the middle child. In 1980, she graduated from Eisenhower High School. From 1982-1984, she attended Oklahoma State University.

Bodybuilding career

Amateur
Vickie competed in athletics and started lifting weights in college. In 1983, she competed in her first competition in Tulsa, Oklahoma, which she won. She worked her way up through the amateur ranks, eventually earning her pro card in 1993 by winning the middleweight class at the NPC Nationals.

Professional
Vickie's long string of high placings as a professional includes three consecutive Ms. International titles from 1999 to 2001.  Those same years, she would also finish second at the Ms. Olympia on three occasions.

Retirement
In 2003, Gates retired from bodybuilder after coming in 7th at the 2003 Ms. Olympia.

Legacy
In 2010, Gates was inducted into the 2010 IFBB Hall of Fame.

Contest history 
1984 Tulsa Classic - 1st
1986 USA Championships - 4th (HW) 
1989 NPC Junior USA Championships - 3rd (MW)
1989 IFBB North American Championship – 2nd (MW)
1990 NPC USA Championships – 10th (MW)
1991 NPC Junior USA Championships - 3rd (HW)
1991 IFBB North American Championship – 9th (HW)
1992 NPC Nationals – 3rd (MW)
1993 NPC USA Championships – 1st (MW)
1993 NPC Nationals – 1st (MW)
1994 IFBB Grand Prix Prague - 5th
1994 Jan Tana Classic - 4th
1995 Ms. International - 11th
1995 Jan Tana Classic - 8th
1996 Ms. International - 3rd
1996 IFBB Ms. Olympia - 5th
1996 Grand Prix Slovakia - 4th
1996 Grand Prix Prague - 4th
1997 Ms. International - 2nd
1997 IFBB Ms. Olympia - 5th
1998 Ms. International - 3rd
1998 IFBB Ms. Olympia - 3rd
1999 Ms. International - 1st
1999 IFBB Ms. Olympia - 2nd
2000 Ms. International - 1st (HW and Overall)
2000 IFBB Ms. Olympia - 2nd (HW)
2001 Ms. International - 1st (HW and Overall)
2001 IFBB Ms. Olympia - 2nd (HW)
2002 Ms. International - 3rd (HW)
2002 IFBB Ms. Olympia - 3rd (HW)
2003 Ms. International - 4th (HW)
2003 IFBB Ms. Olympia - 7th (HW)

Personal life
She is a Christian. Her hobbies include reading the bible and shopping. She currently lives in Arlington, Texas with her daughter Kindra. Since September 1999, she owns a gym called Strictly Fitness in Irving, Texas. She is a personal trainer. She also used to work for Bally Total Fitness. She has been previously married, and at that time she used the last name Gates-Lewis. In 1992, she would meet her then boyfriend, Ronnie Coleman, an IFBB pro bodybuilder who went on to become an 8-time Mr. Olympia and one of the greatest bodybuilders of all time, at a GNC store. She dated Ronnie Coleman for nearly seven years. She is currently single.

References

External links
Official web site

| colspan = 3 align = center | Ms. International
|-
| width = 30% align = center | Preceded by:Yolanda Hughes
| width = 40% align = center | First (1999)
| width = 30% align = center | Succeeded by:Herself
|-
| width = 30% align = center | Preceded by:Herself
| width = 40% align = center | Second (2000)
| width = 30% align = center | Succeeded by:Herself
|-
| width = 30% align = center | Preceded by:Herself
| width = 40% align = center | Third (2001)
| width = 30% align = center | Succeeded by:Yaxeni Oriquen

1962 births
Living people
African-American Christians
African-American female bodybuilders
Oklahoma State University alumni
People from Dallas
People from San Antonio
People from Lawton, Oklahoma
People from Arlington, Texas
Professional bodybuilders
Sportspeople from Arlington, Texas
Sportspeople from Dallas
Sportspeople from Lawton, Oklahoma
Sportspeople from Oklahoma
Sportspeople from San Antonio
Sportspeople from Texas
21st-century African-American people
21st-century African-American women
20th-century African-American sportspeople
20th-century African-American women
20th-century African-American people